"Future Starts Slow" is the second single from indie rock band The Kills' fourth studio album, Blood Pressures (2011). It was released on June 27, 2011 through the independent label Domino. The song has been featured as the opening theme for the American TV miniseries Political Animals (2012), starring Sigourney Weaver.  It was also featured in episodes of Altered Carbon, Person of Interest, and  Walker Independence.

A music video for the song, following the band on their travels around, was directed by Philip Andelman and released on June 20, 2011.

Track listing

Personnel
Alison "VV" Mosshart – vocals, photography [of Jamie Hince]
Jamie "Hotel" Hince – drums, guitar, production, photography [of Alison Mosshart]
Bill Skibbe – co-production

Charts

References

2011 singles
The Kills songs
Domino Recording Company singles
2010 songs